Željko Mitrović (born on 31 May 1967) is a Serbian media magnate, entrepreneur, investor, CEO, and founder of the Pink Media Group.

Career
In 1988, Mitrović founded one of Serbia's first music recording studios. He opened a radio station in 1993, followed by a TV Pink station in 1994. Later on, Mitrović founded the music publishing house CITY Records, which has more than 500 performers under its label. After launching the satellite program, Mitrović launched TV Pink Montenegro in 2002 and Pink BiH, in Bosnia and Herzegovina a year later.

Mitrović included a subsidiary in the Pink International Company: the PFI – Pink Films International – a film production complex catering to blockbusters and TV shows producers. In May 2008, Los Angeles Times conducted an interview with Mitrović and wrote about his new project, a 452,000-square-foot film studio complex.
 
In 2004, Mitrović founded a business jet airline Air Pink, one of seven companies under Pink Media Group. They extended its eleven-airplane fleet with three new Cessna XLS+ aircraft. It specializes in VIP and corporate aviation services.

Mitrović created a new, digital company of the Pink Media Group. The Pink Digital Company is a regional provider of digital communications that bridges the difference and gap between cutting-edge digital creative ideas, products and technologies. Pink Digital Media System has created applications, such as Pink.rs, KlikTV.

Honors and awards
In 2015, Mitrović received the "Golden Chain" award from the Cultural and Educational Community of Belgrade for lasting contribution to culture. In 2014, the Karić foundation awarded Mitrović for outstanding achievements in the sphere of the media, television and film production. In 2012, Mitrović was awarded by The Man magazine, in the category "Self-made man". In 2006, Mitrović received the "Manager of the Year" award from the Belgrade Chamber of Commerce (BCC) for the achievement in the growth and development of the Pink Media Group, as one of the strongest and most influential media/entertainment businesses in Southeast Europe.

References

External links
Pink Media Group website

1967 births
Living people
Serbian businesspeople